Overland Mail is a 1939 American western film directed by Robert F. Hill and starring Jack Randall, Vince Barnett and Dennis Moore. It was produced and distributed by Monogram Pictures which specialized in low-budget second features, particularly westerns.

Synopsis
Two overland mail riders discover that a Native American uprising is likely due to the death of one of the tribe at the hands of townspeople. They discover that a gang of counterfeiters are behind the murder and turn over their leader to the Indian chief.

Cast
 Jack Randall as 	Jack Mason
 Vince Barnett as Porchy
 Jean Joyce as 	Mary Martin
 Tristram Coffin as 	Joe Polini 
 George Cleveland as 	Frank Porter - aka Saunders
 Dennis Moore as Duke Evans
 Glenn Strange as 	Sheriff Dawson
 Jimmie Fox as 	Pat - Storekeeper
 Maxine Leslie as 	Blondie
 Hal Price as 	Lugo
 Merrill McCormick as 	Buck - Henchman
 Joe Garcio as Squint - Henchman 
 Harry Semels as 	Pancho
 Iron Eyes Cody as 	Indian Chief

References

Bibliography
 Pitts, Michael R. Western Movies: A Guide to 5,105 Feature Films. McFarland, 2012.

External links
 

1939 films
1939 Western (genre) films
1930s English-language films
American Western (genre) films
American black-and-white films
Films directed by Robert F. Hill
Monogram Pictures films
1930s American films